This is a list of notable buildings of the Knights of Columbus, a Roman Catholic fraternal service organization founded in 1881 in New Haven, Connecticut.

in Canada

James Cooper House, Toronto, which served as a Knights of Columbus meetinghall from 1910 to 2005
A fire at the Knights of Columbus Hall in St John's, Newfoundland kills 99 on December 12, 1942 (see 1942 in Canada).

in the Philippines
Knights of Columbus Building (Manila)
Knights of Columbus Building (Cagayan de Oro City)

in the United States
''(by state then city or town)

Additional notes

If there is a distinctive architecture for Knights of Columbus halls, it may involve use of the K of C logo (designed in 1883) and components such as fasces, the bundle of sticks with an axe blade, a symbol that generally signifies "strength through unity".

See List of carillons for Knights of Columbus-named tower.

References

Mississippi Landmarks